Christian head covering, also known as Christian veiling, is the traditional practice of women covering their head in a variety of Christian denominations. Some Christian women, based on historic Catholic, Lutheran, Moravian, Reformed, Anglican, Methodist, and Plymouth Brethren teaching, wear the head covering in public worship and during private prayer at home (though some women belonging to these traditions may also choose to wear the head covering outside of prayer and worship), while others, especially traditional Anabaptist Christians, believe women should wear head coverings at all times, based on Saint Paul's dictum that Christians are to "pray without ceasing", Saint Paul's teaching that women being unveiled is dishonourable, and as a reflection of the created order. Genesis 24:65 records the veil as a feminine emblem of modesty. Manuals of early Christianity, including the Didascalia Apostolorum and Pædagogus instructed that a headcovering must be worn by women during prayer and worship, as well as when outside the home. 

The practice of Christian head covering for "praying and prophesying" is taught in the traditional interpretation of 1 Corinthians 11:2-10 in the New Testament of the Bible. The majority of Biblical scholars have held that "verses 4-7 refer to a literal veil or covering of cloth" for "praying and prophesying" and verse 15 to refer to the hair of a woman given to her by nature. Christian headcovering with a cloth veil was the practice of the early Church, being universally taught by the Church Fathers and practiced by Christian women throughout history, continuing to be the ordinary practice among Christians in many parts of the world, such as Romania, Russia, Ukraine, Ethiopia, India, Pakistan, and South Korea; additionally, among Conservative Anabaptists such as the Conservative Mennonite churches and the Dunkard Brethren Church, headcovering is counted as an ordinance of the Church, being worn throughout the day by women. When Saint Paul commanded women to be veiled in 1 Corinthians (which was addressed to all Christians everywhere), the surrounding pagan Greek women did not wear headcoverings; as such, the practice of Christian headcovering was countercultural in the Apostolic Era, being a biblical ordinance rather than a cultural tradition. The style of headcoverings worn by Christian women varies by region, though the early Church's Apostolic Tradition specifies that Christian headcovering is to be observed with an "opaque cloth, not with a veil of thin linen".

History

Bible and the Early Church

During the time of Moses, the Bible records that it was normative for women to wear a headcovering (cf. ). In Numbers 5:18, the sotah (meaning "one who goes astray") ritual, in which the head of a woman accused of adultery is uncovered (made parua), is explicated, implying that normally a woman's head is covered; the Talmud thus teaches that the Torah (Pentateuch) commands women to go out in public with their heads covered. This headcovering worn during biblical times was a veil or headscarf. In the Old Testament's Book of Daniel, Susanna wore a headcovering and wicked men demanded that it be removed so that they might lust after her (cf. ).  records that Rebecca, while traveling to meet Isaac, "did not flaunt her physical beauty" but "veiled herself, increasing her allure through an outward display of modesty." The biblical book Song of Songs records "the erotic nature of hair from the verse, 'Your hair is as a flock of goats' (Song of Songs, 4:1), i.e., from a verse praising her beauty." Jewish law around the time of Jesus stipulated that a married woman who uncovered her hair in public evidenced her infidelity.

Christian head covering was universally practiced by the women of the Early Church, which continued the biblical ordinance. This was attested by multiple Church Fathers throughout the first centuries of Christianity who taught that because the hair of a woman has sexual potency, it should only be for her husband to see and covered the rest of the time. But I would have you know, that the head of every man is Christ; and the head of the woman is the man; and the head of Christ is God. Every man praying or prophesying, having his head covered, dishonoureth his head. But every woman that prayeth or prophesieth with her head uncovered dishonoureth her head: for that is even all one as if she were shaven. For if the woman be not covered, let her also be shorn: but if it be a shame for a woman to be shorn or shaven, let her be covered." The Church Father Hippolytus of Rome while giving instructions for church gatherings said "…let all the women have their heads covered with an opaque cloth, not with a veil of thin linen, for this is not a true covering." The early Christian apologist Tertullian likewise held that the covering should be a substantial one (cf. headscarf):  
In addition to praying and worshipping, the ancient Christian Didascalia Apostolorum directed that Christian women should wear headcoverings in public: "Thou therefore who art a Christian [woman] … if thou wishest to be faithful, please thy husband only, and when thou walkest in the market-place, cover thy head with thy garment, that by thy veil the greatness of thy beauty may be covered; do not adorn the face of thine eyes, but look down and walk veiled; be watchful, not to wash in the baths with men." In the same vein, Clement of Alexandria, an early Christian theologian, instructed in Paedagogus that "Woman and man are to go to church decently attired … Let the woman observe this, further. Let her be entirely covered, unless she happen to be at home. For that style of dress is grave, and protects from being gazed at. And she will never fall, who puts before her eyes modesty, and her shawl; nor will she invite another to fall into sin by uncovering her face. For this is the wish of the Word, since it is becoming for her to pray veiled.”
Clement of Alexandria says: "Because of the angels". By the angels he means righteous and virtuous men. Let her be veiled then, that she may not lead them to stumble into fornication. For the real angels in heaven see her though veiled. Clement of Alexandria explicated this: "It has also been commanded that the head should be veiled and the face covered, for it is a wicked thing for beauty to be a snare to men. Nor is it appropriate for a woman to desire to make herself conspicuous by using a purple veil." Tertullian explains that in his days, the women of the Corinthian church from the age of puberty onwards (unmarried and married) were practicing Christian headcovering despite the fact that non-Christians in the region did not observe this ordinance; as such, the practice of Christians was countercultural. In his deliberative treatise De virginibus velandis ("On the Veiling of Virgins") Tertullian argumented from scripture, natural law and Christian disclipline that from puberty virgins ought to be veiled when in public. The custom of some Carthaginian consecrated virgins not being veiled when the church gathered was sharply criticised as being contrary to the truth. This is only 150 years after the Apostle Paul wrote 1 Corinthians. He said, "So, too, did the Corinthians themselves understand [Paul]. In fact, at this day the Corinthians do veil their virgins [and married women]. What the apostles taught, their disciples approve." "Early church history bears witness that in Rome, Antioch, and Africa the custom [of wearing the head covering] became the norm [for the Church]." The historian Cory Anderson stated that the reason for this is because the early Church understood Saint Paul's instruction to apply to the whole church. Origen of Alexandria wrote, "There are angels in the midst of our assembly… we have here a twofold Church, one of men, the other of angels… And since there are angels present… women, when they pray, are ordered to have a covering upon their heads because of those angels. They assist the saints and rejoice in the Church." In the second half of the third century, women praying with their heads covered is mentioned as church practice by St. Victorinus in his commentary of the Apocalypse of John. The early Christian Acts of Thomas, written in Syriac Aramaic, assigns Hell as the fate of women who did not wear a headcovering, stating:

"The Apostolic Constitutions [4th century AD] … expressly commanded that the women should have their heads covered in the Church." In the same era, the Early Church Father John Chrysostom (407) delineated Saint Paul's teaching, explaining that Christian women should wear a cloth headcovering when in public in view of Saint Paul's comparison of a woman not wearing a veil to being shaven, which he states is "always dishonourable": 

John Chrysostom held that to be disobedient to the Christian teaching on veiling was harmful and sinful: "… the business of whether to cover one's head was legislated by nature (see 1 Cor 11:14–15). When I say 'nature', I mean 'God'. For he is the one who created nature. Take note, therefore, what great harm comes from overturning these boundaries! And don't tell me that this is a small sin."
Jerome (420) noted that the hair cap and the prayer veil is worn by Christian women in Egypt and Syria, who "do not go about with heads uncovered in defiance of the apostle's command, for they wear a close-fitting cap and a veil". Augustine of Hippo (354430) writes about the head covering, "It is not becoming, even in married women, to uncover their hair, since the apostle commands women to keep their heads covered." Early Christian art also confirms that women wore headcoverings during this time period.

Middle Ages and Modern Era 

Until at least the 19th century and still extant in certain regions, the wearing of a head covering, both in the public and while attending church, was regarded as customary for Christian women, in line with the injunction to do so in 1 Corinthians 11, in the Mediterranean, European, Indian, Middle Eastern, and African societies. With the custom of Christian headcovering being practiced for centuries, in the Middle Ages, a woman who did not wear a head covering was interpreted to be "a prostitute or adulteress", though this was not the case in the preceding Ante-Nicene period during which pagan Greek women went about in public and prayed bareheaded (in contrast to the Christian women who veiled themselves).

Christian literature, with respect to demonology, has documented that during exorcisms, possessed women have attempted to tear off their headcovering, as with the case of Frances Bruchmüllerin in Sulzbach.

The practice of headcovering continues to be the ordinary practice among Christian women in many parts of the world, such as Romania, Russia, Ukraine, Ethiopia, India, Pakistan, and South Korea. In the West, "up until World War I, a woman slipped on a white cap immediately upon arising…and some type of hat or bonnet was worn every time she left the house." The custom has declined in America and Western Europe, though certain Christian denominations (such as those of Conservative Anabaptism) continue to require it and many Christian women continue to observe the ancient practice. David Bercot, a scholar on early Christianity, noted that relatively recent interpretations in the Western World that do not necessitate the wearing of headcoverings by women, in contrast to the historic practice of female Christian veiling, are linked with the rise of feminism in the 20th century. In 1968, American feminist group — the National Organization for Women — released a "Resolution on Head Coverings”:

In Milwaukee, Wisconsin in 1969, fifteen women from the Milwaukee chapter of the National Organization for Women protested in St. John de Nepomuc Catholic Church; after taking their place at the communion rail, the women removed their hats and placed them on the communion rail. The following week, the Milwaukee Sentinel published a letter to the editor from “Mrs. M. E., Milwaukee,” who felt that the protest was “immature exhibitionism.”

Nevertheless, in the 21st century, the practice of headcovering is being revived in the Western World among some women belonging to various Christian congregations where the practice lapsed, though other denominations have practiced the biblical ordinance perpetually, as with Dunkard Brethren or Conservative Mennonites, the latter of which count headcovering among the seven ordinances of the Church. The sociologist Cory Anderson stated that for those Christian women who continually wear it, such as Conservative Anabaptists, the headcovering serves as a outward testimony that often allows for evangelism.

Current practices

Styles
With respect to the early Church, Tom Shank concluded that there were a variety of headcoverings worn by the early Christians, ranging from shawls to kapps: "William McGrath (1991) found that etchings in the Catacomb of Domitila in Rome—dating as far back as A.D. 95—show 'modestly dressed sisters wearing the cap style veiling.' Warren Henderson, writing about the catacombs, also observed that women covered their heads, but emphasized the cloth styles." In the present-day, various styles of headcoverings are worn by Christian women:

Denominational practices

Western Christianity

Continuing the historic Christian practice since the time of the Apostolic era, in Western Europe and North America at the start of the 20th century, it was commonplace for women in mainstream Christian denominations to wear head coverings during church services, with female members of certain denominations (chiefly Anabaptist Churches) wearing them throughout the day—an ordinance that is still enjoined in many traditional Anabaptist fellowships. These included Anabaptist (inclusive of the Mennonite, Hutterite, Bruderhof, Schwarzenau Brethren, Apostolic Christian, Amish, and River Brethren traditions), Anglican, Catholic, Lutheran, Methodist, Moravian, Plymouth Brethren, Quaker, and Reformed (inclusive of the Congregationalist, Continental Reformed and Presbyterian traditions) Churches.

In Roman Catholicism, headcovering for women was unanimously held by the Latin Church until the 1983 Code of Canon Law came into effect. A headcovering in the Catholic tradition carries the status of a sacramental. Historically, women were required to veil their heads when receiving the Eucharist following the Councils of Autun and Angers. Similarly, in 585, the Synod of Auxerre (France) stated that women should wear a head-covering during the Holy Mass. The Synod of Rome in 743 declared that "A woman praying in church without her head covered brings shame upon her head, according to the word of the Apostle", a position later supported by Pope Nicholas I in 866, for church services." In the Middle Ages, Thomas Aquinas (1225–1274) said that "the man existing under God should not have a covering over his head to show that he is immediately subject to God; but the woman should wear a covering to show that besides God she is naturally subject to another." In the 1917 Code of Canon Law it was a requirement that women cover their heads in church. It said, "women, however, shall have a covered head and be modestly dressed, especially when they approach the table of the Lord." Veiling was not specifically addressed in the 1983 revision of the Code, which declared the 1917 Code abrogated. According to the new Code, former law only has interpretive weight in norms that are repeated in the 1983 Code; all other norms are simply abrogated. In certain countries, such as in India, the wearing of a headscarf by women remains the norm and sacraments, such as the Eucharist, have been refused to ladies who present themselves to receive the elements without wearing a headcovering in church.

Martin Luther, the Protestant Reformer and father of Lutheranism, encouraged wives to wear a veil in public worship. The General Rubrics of the Evangelical Lutheran Synodical Conference of North America, as contained in "The Lutheran Liturgy", state in a section titled "Headgear for Women": "It is laudable custom, based upon a Scriptural injunction (1 Cor. 11:3-15), for women to wear an appropriate head covering in Church, especially at the time of divine service."

In the Reformed tradition, both John Calvin, the founder of the Continental Reformed Churches, and John Knox, the founder of the Presbyterian Churches, both called for women to wear head coverings. John Calvin taught that headcovering was the cornerstone of modesty for Christian women and held that those who removed their veils from their hair would soon come to remove the clothing covering their breasts and that covering their midriffs, leading to societal indecency:
 
Furthermore, Calvin stated "Should any one now object, that her hair is enough, as being a natural covering, Paul says that it is not, for it is such a covering as requires another thing to be made use of for covering it." Nevertheless, some Reformed figures of the 16th and 17th centuries held that head covering was a cultural institution, including Theodore Beza, William Whitaker, the Geneva Bible, Westminster Divines Daniel Cawdry, and Herbert Palmer, Matthew Poole, and Francis Turretin.

John Wesley, the founder of Methodism, held that a woman, "especially in a religious assembly", should "keep on her veil". All early Methodist divines, including Thomas Coke, Adam Clarke, Joseph Sutcliffe, Joseph Benson and Walter Ashbel Sellew, reflected the same historic position of 1 Corinthians 11—that veils are enjoined for women, while caps are forbidden to men while praying.

Roger Williams, the founder of the first Baptist church in North America, taught that women should veil themselves during worship as this was the practice of the early Church.

In nations in regions such as Eastern Europe and the Indian subcontinent, nearly all Christian women wear head coverings while praying at home and during church services. In the United Kingdom, it is common for women to wear a Christian headcovering while attending formal religious services, such as church weddings. At worship, in parts of the Western World, many women started to wear bonnets as their headcoverings, and later, hats became predominant. However, eventually, in North America and parts of Western Europe, this practice started to decline, with some exceptions including Christian women who wear plain dress, such as Conservative Quaker women, and many Anabaptist women (including those who are Mennonites {such as the Old Order Mennonites and Conservative Mennonites}, River Brethren {such as the Old Order River Brethren and Calvary Holiness Church}, Hutterites, Bruderhof, Schwarzenau Brethren {such as the Old Order Schwarzenau Brethren and Dunkard Brethren Church}, Amish, Apostolic Christians and Charity Christians). Headcovering is among the seven ordinances of Conservative Mennonites. Furthermore, certain Conservative Methodist women, such as those belonging to the Fellowship of Independent Methodist Churches, also wear headcoverings, as do Traditional Catholic and Plain Catholic women, in addition to Plymouth Brethren women, and women with church membership in conservative Reformed and Presbyterian churches, such as the Heritage Reformed Congregations, Netherlands Reformed Congregations, Free Presbyterian Church of Scotland, Free Presbyterian Church of North America and Presbyterian Reformed Church. Some female believers in the Lutheran Churches, as well as the Churches of Christ, cover too. Certain Pentecostal Churches, such as the Church of Our Lord Jesus Christ of the Apostolic Faith, Ukrainian Pentecostal Church, and the Christian Congregation observe the veiling of women as well. Female members of Jehovah's Witnesses may only lead prayer and teaching when no baptized male is available to, and must do so wearing a head covering.

Nuns of the Roman Catholic, Western Orthodox, Lutheran and Anglican traditions often wear a veil as a part of their religious habit. Likewise, Moravian females wear a lace headcovering called a haube, when serving as dieners in the celebration of lovefeasts. Deaconesses in certain Methodist connexions, such as the African Methodist Episcopal Zion Church and the Pillar of Fire Church, wear a deaconess cap.

Eastern Christianity

Among the churches of Eastern Christianity (including the Eastern Catholic, Eastern Orthodox and Eastern Lutheran traditions), it is customary for women to cover their heads with a headscarf while in church (and oftentimes in the public too); an example of this practice occurs in the Russian Orthodox Church. In Albania, Christian women often wear white veils, although their eyes are visible; moreover, in that nation, in Orthodox church buildings, women are separated from men by latticework partitions during the church service. An ancient Orthodox Christian prayer titled the "Prayer for binding up the head of a woman" has been used liturgically for the blessing of a woman's headcovering(s), which was historically worn by an Orthodox Christian woman at all times with the exception of sleeping:

Women belonging to the community of Old Believers wear opaque Christian headcoverings, with those who are married keeping a knitted bonnet known as a povoinik underneath.

In other cases, the choice may be individual, or vary within a country or jurisdiction. Among Eastern Orthodox women in Greece, the practice of wearing a head covering in church gradually declined over the course of the 20th century.

Eastern Orthodox clergy of all levels have head coverings, sometimes with veils in the case of monastics or celibates, that are donned and removed at certain points in the services. In U.S. churches they are less commonly worn.

Eastern Orthodox nuns wear a head covering called an apostolnik, which is worn at all times, and is the only part of the monastic habit which distinguishes them from Eastern Orthodox monks.

Oriental Christianity

In Oriental Orthodox Christianity, Coptic women historically covered their head and face in public and in the presence of men. During the 19th century, upper-class urban Christian and Muslim women in Egypt wore a garment which included a head cover and a burqa (muslin cloth that covered the lower nose and the mouth). The name of this garment, harabah, derives from early Christian and Judaic religious vocabulary, which may indicate the origins of the garment itself. Unmarried women generally wore white veils while married women wore black. The practice began to decline by the early 20th century.

Women in the Believers Eastern Church, an Oriental Protestant denomination, wear head coverings. Its Metropolitan Bishop, K. P. Yohannan teaches that “When a woman wears the symbol of God’s government, a head covering, she is essentially a rebuke to all the fallen angels. Her actions say to them, ‘You have rebelled against the Holy God, but I submit to Him and His headship. I choose not to follow your example of rebellion and pride.'”

Scriptural basis

Christian Bible/Old Testament (including the Apocrypha/Deuterocanon)
Passages such as Genesis 24:65, Numbers 5:18, Song of Solomon 5:7, Susanna 13:31–22, and Isaiah 47:2 indicate that believing women wore a head covering during the Old Testament era. Song of Songs 4:1 records that hair is sensual in nature, with Solomon praising its beauty.

Christian Bible/New Testament

1 Corinthians 11:2–16 contains a passage referring to the use of headcoverings for women (and the uncovering of the heads of men).

Paul introduces this passage by praising the Corinthian Christians for remembering the "ordinances" (also translated as "traditions" or "teachings") that he had passed on to them (verse 2). Included in these apostolic ordinances that Paul is discussing in 1 Corinthians 11 are the headcovering and the Eucharist.

Paul then explains the Christian use of head coverings using the subjects of headship, glory, angels, natural hair lengths, and the practice of the churches. This led to the universal practice of headcovering in Christianity. Theologians David Lipscomb and J. W. Shepherd in their Commentary on 1st Corinthians explicate the theology behind the traditional Christian interpretation of 1 Corinthians 11, writing that Paul taught that "Every man, therefore, who in praying or prophesying covers his head, thereby acknowledges himself dependent on some earthly head other than his heavenly head, and thereby takes from the latter the honor which is due to him as the head of man." In the Old Testament, priests (who were all male) wore turbans and caps as Jesus was not known in that era, establishing "the reason why there was no command to honour Him by praying or prophesying with heads uncovered." With the revelation of Jesus to humanity, "Any man who prays or prophesies with something on his head dishonours his head (Christ)." In light of 1 Corinthians 11:4, Christian men throughout church history have thus removed their caps when praying and worshipping, as well as when entering a church. As the biblical passage progresses, Paul teaches that:

Ezra Palmer Gould, a professor at the Episcopal Divinity School, noted that "The long hair and the veil were both intended as a covering of the head, and as a sign of true womanliness, and of the right relation of woman to man; and hence the absence of one had the same significance as that of the other." This is reflected in the patristic teaching of the Early Church Father John Chrysostom, who explained the two coverings discussed by Saint Paul in 1 Corinthians 11:
 John William McGarvey, in delineating verse 10 of 1 Corinthians 11, suggested that "To abandon this justifiable and well established symbol of subordination would be a shock to the submissive and obedient spirit of the ministering angels (Isaiah 6:2) who, though unseen, are always present with you in your places of worship (Matthew 18:10-31; Psalm 138:1; 1 Timothy 5:21; ch. 4:9; Ecclesiastes 5:6)". Furthermore, verse 10 refers to the cloth veil as a sign of power or authority that highlights the unique God-given role of a Christian woman and grants her the ability to then "pray and prophesy with the spiritual gifts she has been given" (cf. complementarianism). Irenaeus' explanation constitutes an early Christian commentary on this biblical verse. Related to this is the fact that Verse 10, in many early copies of the Bible (such as certain vg, copbo, and arm), is rendered with the word "veil" (κάλυμμα kalumma) rather than the word "authority" (ἐξουσία exousia); the Revised Standard Version reflects this, displaying the verse as follows: "That is why a woman ought to have a veil on her head, because of the angels". Similarly, a scholarly footnote in the New American Bible notes that presence of the word "authority (exousia) may possibly be due to mistranslation of an Aramaic word for veil". This mistranslation may be due to "the fact that in Aramaic the roots of the word power and veil are spelled the same." Ronald Knox adds that certain biblical scholars hold that "Paul is attempting, by means of this Greek word, to render a Hebrew word that signifies the veil traditionally worn by a married Jewish woman." Nevertheless, the "word exousia had come at Corinth, or in the Corinthian Church, to be used for 'a veil,' or 'covering'…just as the word 'kingdom' in Greek may be used for 'a crown' (compare regno as the name of the pope's tiara), so authority may mean a sign of authority (Revised Version), or 'a covering, in sign that she is under the power of her husband' (Authorized Version, margin)." Jean Chardin's scholarship on the Near East thus notes that women "wear a veil, in sign that they are under subjection." In addition to Irenaeus, Church Fathers, including Hippolytus, Origen, Chrysostom, Epiphanius, Jerome, Augustine, and Bede write verse 10 using the word "veil" (κάλυμμα kalumma).

Relevant texts

Certain denominations of Christianity, such as traditional Anabaptists (e.g. Conservative Mennonites), combine this with 1 Thessalonians 5 ("Rejoice always; pray without ceasing; in everything give thanks; for this is God's will for you in Christ Jesus. Do not quench the Spirit; do not despise prophetic utterances") and hold that Christian women are commanded to wear a headcovering without ceasing. Anabaptist expositors, such as Daniel Willis, have cited the Early Church Father John Chrysostom, who provided additional reasons from Scripture for the practice of a Christian woman wearing her headcovering all the time—that "if to be shaven is always dishonourable, it is plain too that being uncovered is always a reproach" and that "because of the angels…signifies that not at the time of prayer only but also continually, she ought to be covered." A Conservative Anabaptist publication titled The Significance of the Christian Woman's Veiling, authored by Merle Ruth, teaches with regard to the continual wearing of the headcovering by believing women, that it is:

The biblical passage has been interpreted by Anabaptist Christians and Orthodox Christians, among others, in conjunction with modesty in clothing (1 Timothy 2:9-10 "I also want the women to dress modestly, with decency and propriety, adorning themselves, not with elaborate hairstyles or gold or pearls or expensive clothes, but with good deeds, appropriate for women who profess to worship God"). Genesis 24:65 records the veil as a feminine emblem of modesty. The wearing of headcoverings in public by Christian women was commanded in early Christian texts, such as the Didascalia Apostolorum and the Pædagogus, for the purpose of modesty.

Verse four of 1 Corinthians 11 uses the Greek words  for "head covered", the same Greek words used in Esther 6:12 (Septuagint) where "because he [Haman] had been humiliated, he headed home, draping an external covering over his head" (additionally certain manuscripts of the Septuagint in Esther 6:12 use the Greek words , which is the "perfect passive participle of the key verb used in 1 Corinthians 11:6 and 7 for both a man’s and a woman’s covering his or her head [κατακαλύπτω]")—facts that New Testament scholar Rajesh Gandhi states makes it clear that the passage enjoins the wearing of a cloth veil by Christian women. Biblical scholar Christopher R. Hutson contextualizes the verse citing Greek texts of the same era, such as Moralia:
 Verses five through seven, as well as verse thirteen, of 1 Corinthians 11 use a form of the Greek word for "veiled",  κατακαλύπτω katakalupto; this is contrasted with the Greek word περιβόλαιον peribolaion, which is mentioned in verse 15 of the same chapter, in reference to "something cast around" as with the "hair of a woman … like a mantle cast around". These separate Greek words indicate that there are thus two headcoverings that Paul states are compulsory for Christian women to wear, a cloth veil and her natural hair. The words Paul uses in 1 Corinthians 11:5 are employed by contemporary Hellenistic philosophers, such as Philo (30 BC–45 AD) in Special Laws 3:60, who uses "head uncovered" (akatakalyptō tē kephalē) [ἀκατακαλύπτῳ τῇ κεφαλῇ] and "it is clear that Philo is speaking of a head covering being removed because the priest had just removed her kerchief"; additionally, akatakalyptos [ἀκατακάλυπτος] likewise "means 'uncovered' in Philo, Allegorical Interpretation II,29, and in Polybius 15,27.2 (second century BC)." 1 Corinthians 11:16 concludes the passage Paul wrote about Christian veiling: "But if anyone wants to argue about this, I simply say that we have no other custom than this, and neither do God's other churches." Michael Marlowe, a scholar of biblical languages, explains that Saint Paul's inclusion of this statement was to affirm that the "headcovering practice is a matter of apostolic authority and tradition, and not open to debate", evidenced by repeating a similar sentence with which he starts the passage: "maintain the traditions even as I delivered them to you".

Interpretive issues

There are several key sections of 1 Corinthians 11:2–16 that Bible commentators and Christian congregations, since the 1960s, have held differing opinions about, which have resulted in either churches continuing the practice of wearing headcoverings, or not practicing the ordinance.
 Gender-based headship: Paul connects the use (or non-use) of headcoverings with the biblical distinctions between each gender. In 1 Corinthians 11:3, Paul wrote, "Christ is the head of every man, and the man is the head of a woman." He immediately continues with a gender-based teaching on the use of headcoverings: "Every man who has something on his head while praying or prophesying disgraces his head. But every woman who has her head uncovered while praying or prophesying disgraces her head."
 Glory and worship: Paul next explains that the use (or non-use) of headcoverings is related to God's glory during times of prayer and prophesy. In 1 Corinthians 11:7, he states that man is the "glory of God" and that for this reason "a man ought not to have his head covered." In the same verse, Paul also states that the woman is the "glory of man." He explains that statement in the subsequent two verses by referring to the woman's creation in Genesis 2:18, and then concludes, "Therefore the woman ought to have a symbol of authority on her head" (verse 10). In other words, the "glory of God" (man) is to be uncovered during times of worship, while the "glory of man" (woman) is to be covered.
 Angels: In 1 Corinthians 11:10, Paul says "Therefore the woman ought to have a symbol of authority on her head, because of the angels" (NASB), also rendered "That is why a woman ought to have a veil on her head, because of the angels" (RSV). Many interpreters admit that Paul does not provide much explanation for the role of angels in this context. Some popular interpretations of this passage are:
 Nature and hair lengths: In 1 Corinthians 11:13-15, Paul asks a rhetorical question about the propriety of headcoverings, and then answers it himself with a lesson from nature: "Judge for yourselves: is it proper for a woman to pray to God with her head uncovered? Does not even nature itself teach you that if a man has long hair, it is a dishonor to him, but if a woman has long hair, it is a glory to her? For her hair is given to her for a covering." The historic interpretation of this passage, for example seen in Homilies of John Chrysostom, an Early Church Father, reiterates Paul's teaching that since a woman naturally "covers" her head with her natural hair, she likewise ought to cover it with a cloth headcovering while praying or prophesying (cf. conditional sentence).

Michael Marlowe, a scholar of biblical languages, explicates the reductio ad absurdum that Paul the Apostle used in the passage:

Paul's discussion of hair lengths was not to command any specific hair measurement, but rather, a discussion of "male and female differentiation" as women generally had longer hair than men; while the males of Sparta wore shoulder-length hair, the hair of Spartan women was significantly longer.
 Church practice: In 1 Corinthians 11:16, Paul responded to any readers who may disagree with his teaching about the use of headcoverings: "But if one is inclined to be contentious, we have no other practice, nor have the churches of God." This may indicate that headcoverings were considered a standard, universal Christian symbolic practice (rather than a local cultural custom). In other words, while churches were spread out geographically and contained a diversity of cultures, they all practiced headcovering for female members.

Interpretive conclusions and resulting practices 

Due to the aforementioned issues (such as those listed above), Bible commentators and Christian congregations since the 1960s have either advocated for the continued practice of wearing headcoverings, or have discarded the observance of ordinance as understood in its historic sense. While many Christian congregations, such as those of the Conservative Anabaptists, continue to enjoin the wearing of headcoverings for female members, others do not.
 Some Christian denominations, such as Anabaptist Churches and Orthodox Churches, view Christian headcovering as a practice that Paul intended for all Christians, in all locations, during all time periods and so they continue the practice within their congregations. This view was taught by the early Church Fathers and held universally by undivided Christianity for several centuries afterward. This historic interpretation is linked with the God-ordained order of headship. Conservative Anabaptists and Old Order Anabaptists hold that because "the testimony of headship and the angels apply to all times of the believer's life, not only church services", in addition to biblical injunctions to "pray often, even continually (Acts 6:3-4, 6; 12:5; Romans 1:8-10; Ephesians 1:15-19; 6:18-20; Colossians 1:3-4; 5:17; 2 Timothy 1:3-6)", women are called to wear the headcovering throughout the day. The sociologist Cory Anderson stated that for those Christian women who continually wear it, the headcovering serves as a outward testimony that often allows for evangelism. 
 A modern interpretation is that Paul's commands regarding headcovering were a cultural mandate that was only for the 1st-century Corinthian church. This view states that Paul was simply trying to create a distinction between uncovered Corinthian prostitutes and godly Corinthian Christian women, and that in the modern era, headcoverings are not necessary within a church.
 A recent interpretation, first formulated in 1965 by the Scandinavian theologian Abel Isaakson, purports that Paul stated that the "hair" (specifically "long hair") is the sole covering mentioned in the entire passage; 1 Corinthians 11:15 (NRSV) reads "but if a woman has long hair, it is her glory? For her hair is given to her for a covering." However, some have taken issue with the fact that the Greek word used for covering in verse 15 (περιβόλαιον) is a different word than the form of the word used for veiling/covering in verses 5-7 and 13 (κατακαλύπτω), the latter of which means "to cover wholly" or "to veil". Moderator of the General Assembly of the Free Church of Scotland (Continuing) John W. Keddie contended that if simply any hair were the covering Paul was talking about, then verse 6 would read "For if the women have no hair on her head, let her also be shorn", rendering the passage to be nonsensical.

See also 

Coif
Headscarf
Kerchief
Tichel, Orthodox Jewish headcovering
Veil

References

Notes

Citations

Further reading

External links
Head Covering Through the Centuries - Scroll Publishing
What the Early Christians Believed About The Head Covering - Scroll Publishing 
The Head Covering Movement | 1 Corinthians 11 For Today
The Head Coverings of 1 Corinthians 11 (2005) – Rev. Paul K. Williams
The Headcovering: Cultural or Counter-Cultural - Dr. Finny Kuruvilla
Haman, Head Coverings, and First Corinthians 11:1-16 - Dr. Rajesh Gandhi
Headcoverings in Scripture: What Does Church History Teach? by Greg Price
Headcovering, 1 Corinthians 11, and Orthodoxy - Craig Truglia
"…Let Her Be Veiled.": An in-depth study of 1 Corinthians 11:1-16 by Tom Shank - Torch Publications
Church history and the covering by Anna Grace Wood
The Scriptural Headveiling by Harold S. Martin (1978) - Anabaptist Doctrine
The Woman’s Headcovering by Michael Marlowe (2008) - Bible Research
 

Anabaptism
Headcovering
Headcovering
First Epistle to the Corinthians
Modesty in Christianity
Non-clerical religious clothing
Headcovering
Religious headgear
Veils